General elections were held in Rhodesia in April 1979, the first where the majority black population elected the majority of seats in parliament. The elections were held following the Internal Settlement negotiated by the Rhodesian Front government of Ian Smith and were intended to provide a peaceful transition to majority rule on terms not harmful to White Rhodesians. In accordance with the Internal Settlement, on 1 June, Rhodesia officially became the nation of Zimbabwe Rhodesia, under the government of the United African National Council elected in the 1979 elections. The Internal Settlement was not approved internationally but the incoming government under Bishop Abel Muzorewa did decide to participate in the Lancaster House talks which led to the end of the dispute and the creation of Zimbabwe.

Electoral system
Under the agreement of 1978, the new Zimbabwe Rhodesia House of Assembly was to consist of 100 members. 20 were to be elected on the old roll with property, income and education qualifications, which most black citizens did not meet, and which was previously used to elect the majority of the Rhodesia House of Assembly. 72 seats were elected by the "Common Roll" which every adult in the country had a vote. Owing to the lack of an electoral roll, voters were instead marked with ink on their fingers to stop multiple voting. Once the 92 members had been elected, they assembled to vote for eight White non-constituency members. All the candidates for these posts were members of the Rhodesian Front.

The 20 White Roll members were elected from new constituencies made up of combinations of the previous constituencies. The Common Roll members were elected by province using a closed list system. It was intended to set up a full electoral register and institute single-member constituencies for future elections.

Campaign
The main question in the election campaign was how many Africans would vote in the common roll election. The Patriotic Front parties, Zimbabwe African National Union and Zimbabwe African People's Union, pledged to disrupt the election and called for a boycott. By 1979, all of Rhodesia apart from the central area between Salisbury and Bulawayo was under a form of martial law due to attacks by the Patriotic Front's armies, the Zimbabwe African National Liberation Army (ZANLA) and Zimbabwe People's Revolutionary Army (ZIPRA).

In the event the turnout was quite respectable in Mashonaland, although somewhat depressed in Manicaland and Victoria. In Matabeleland South, where ZIPRA was strongest, the turnout was lowest.

Results

Common roll
Polling day was 21 April 1979.

Candidates and elected members

* – Subsequently, formed the Zimbabwe Democratic Party (see below)

** – These candidates had resigned from the United National Federal Party and joined the Zimbabwe United Peoples' Organisation after nominations had closed. It was ruled that their candidatures stood.

White roll
Polling day was 10 April 1979.

White non-constituency members
Polling day was 7 May 1979. Eight seats were up for election.

Changes during the Assembly
John Moses Chirimbani (UANC, Manicaland) was elected as the Speaker of the House of Assembly on 8 May 1979, and therefore an ex officio member. On 25 May, John Zwenhamo Ruredzo was appointed to replace him.

Robert Siyoka (UNFP, Matabeleland South) resigned, and was replaced by Sami Thomani Siyoka on 28 June 1979.

On 25 June 1979 James Chikerema led a group of eight elected UANC members in resigning from the party, and on 29 June seven of the eight formed the Zimbabwe Democratic Party. Actor Mupinyuri (UANC, Mashonaland Central) rejoined the UANC shortly after resigning from it. The seven who joined are denoted by asterisks in the lists above. A questionable wording in the electoral law led to the UANC taking legal action to disqualify the seven on the grounds that they had to keep their membership of the party to remain members of the Assembly, but Chikerema was successful in defending the right to break away.

Hilary Gwyn Squires resigned in June 1979, moving to South Africa to take up a legal career. David Colville Smith was returned unopposed as Rhodesian Front candidate for Borrowdale constituency on 24 July 1979.

Terrence Mashambanhaka (UANC, Mashonaland Central) was murdered on 16 September 1979 after being lured to an ambush at 'peace talks' with ZANLA forces. Abel Muringazuwa Madombwe was appointed to the Assembly to replace him on 27 November 1979.

Theunis de Klerk (RF, Lundi) was killed in a rocket attack on his home on 20 September 1979. Donald Galbraith Goddard was returned unopposed to follow him on 30 November 1979.

United Nations reaction
The United Nations Security Council passed several resolutions against the "illegal" election, including Resolution 445 and Resolution 448, both of which argued that the election was not representative of the Zimbabwean people and was designed to entrench white minority rule. In these resolutions, the UN declared the results of the election null and void.

Sources
 Rhodesia Government Gazette (candidates for White Roll constituencies; elected MPs)
 The Herald (common roll constituencies and election results)

References

Zimbabwe
Elections in Rhodesia
1979 in Rhodesia
April 1979 events in Africa
Zimbabwe
Election and referendum articles with incomplete results